Lori Tan Chinn is an American actress and comedian. She was a recurring character in the Netflix series Orange Is the New Black and currently stars as Awkwafina's Grandma on Comedy Central's Awkwafina Is Nora from Queens (2020–present.) Chinn began her acting career on Broadway, where she played Miss Higa Jiga in Lovely Ladies, Kind Gentlemen (1970.) She was also a notable member of the Katherine Dunham Company and performed African dance with Syvilla Fort.

Early life
Chinn was born in Seattle, Washington. She is of Hoisan, Chinese descent. Chinn moved to New York City by herself in 1969.

Filmography

Film

Television

Theatre

References

External links
 
 

Living people
American people of Chinese descent
American film actresses
Actresses from Seattle
American musical theatre actresses
American television actresses
1948 births
20th-century American actresses
21st-century American actresses